Black mud turtle may refer to:

East African black mud turtle (Pelusios subniger), a pelomedusid turtle found East Africa.
Seychelles black terrapin (Pelusios seychellensis), a recently extinct pelomedusid turtle that was once endemic to Seychelles.
Black marsh turtle (Siebenrockiella crassicollis), a geoemydid turtle found in Southeast Asia.

See also
Black terrapin (disambiguation)
Mud turtles
Pelusios

Animal common name disambiguation pages